Dunn's Hole is a large chamber cave in Trelawny Parish, Jamaica. It consists of a very large chamber approximately 200 metres long, 100 metres wide and 80 metres high, located at the bottom of a 200-metre pit. It is the largest known underground chamber in Jamaica. The main chamber contains a large stalagmite approximately 8 metres high.

See also
 List of caves in Jamaica
Jamaican Caves Organisation

References

External links
Survey Map.
Photos
Aerial view.
Dunn's Hole Cave - Jamaican Caves Organisation

Caves of Jamaica
Geography of Trelawny Parish
Caves of the Caribbean